Admiral Henry Eden (1798 – 30 January 1888) was a senior British Royal Navy officer who went on to be Second Naval Lord.

Naval career
He was born the fourth son of Thomas Eden of Wimbledon, Surrey, the Deputy-Auditor of Greenwich Hospital. Eden joined the Royal Navy in 1811. He was given command of the sixth-rate HMS Conway in 1832, the second-rate HMS Impregnable in 1839 and the first-rate HMS Caledonia in 1840. His last seagoing command was HMS Collingwood from which he was invalided home in 1844.

In 1846 he was made private secretary to Lord Auckland, First Lord of the Admiralty.

He became Second Naval Lord in March 1855 and Third Naval Lord in April 1857 before moving back up to Second Naval Lord again in November 1857 and leaving the Admiralty in March 1858.

Family
In 1849 he married Elizabeth Harriet Georgiana Beresford, daughter of Lord George Beresford. They lived at Gillingham Hall in Norfolk but had no children.

References

|-

|-

1798 births
1888 deaths
Royal Navy admirals
Lords of the Admiralty